The 2002 Rhode Island gubernatorial election took place on November 5, 2002. Incumbent Republican Governor Lincoln Almond was term-limited. Republican Donald Carcieri won the open seat, defeating Democrat Myrth York. , this was the last time the Republican candidate won Providence County.

Republican primary
A Republican primary was held on September 10.

Candidates
Donald Carcieri, businessman
Jim Bennett

Results

Results by county

Results by municipality

Source:

Democratic primary
A Democratic primary was held on September 10.

Candidates
Antonio J. Pires, former Rhode Island State Representative.
Sheldon Whitehouse, Attorney General of Rhode Island, former U.S. Attorney for the District of Rhode Island
Myrth York, former Rhode Island Senator, 1994 and 1998 Democratic nominee for Governor

Polling

Results

Results by county

Results by municipality

Source:

General election

Predictions

Polling

Results

Notes

References

See also

2002
Rhode Island
Gubernatorial